On the Banks of Allan Water is a 1916 British silent film directed by Wilfred Noy.

Cast
 Basil Gill as Richard Warden 
 J. Hastings Batson as Sir John Warden  
 Roy Byford as David Graeme  
 F.G. Clifton as James Hart  
 Violet Graham as Elsie Graeme  
 Grania Gray as Lady Ida Barrington

References

Bibliography
 Low, Rachael. History of the British Film, 1914-1918. Routledge, 2005.

External links

1916 films
1916 drama films
British drama films
Films directed by Wilfred Noy
British silent feature films
British black-and-white films
1910s English-language films
1910s British films
Silent drama films